James Franklin Fries (August 25, 1938 – November 7, 2021) was an American rheumatologist and author.

References

1938 births
2021 deaths
American rheumatologists
American self-help writers
Deaths from dementia in Colorado
People from Normal, Illinois
Stanford University alumni
Stanford University School of Medicine faculty
Writers from Illinois